Küllüce can refer to:

 Küllüce, Başmakçı
 Küllüce, Tercan